Shredit may refer to:
ShredIt, software for secure data erasure
 Shred-it, Canadian document-destruction company